The 1986 British Grand Prix (formally the XXXIX Shell Oils British Grand Prix) was a Formula One motor race held at Brands Hatch in Kent, England on 13 July 1986. It was the ninth race of the 1986 FIA Formula One World Championship.

French driver Jacques Laffite broke both legs during a multi-car pile-up at the start, resulting in the end of his Formula One career. Laffite, driving a Ligier-Renault, was assisted by Zakspeed driver Jonathan Palmer, a qualified general practitioner before taking up motor racing in the late 1970s. Laffite was making his 176th Formula One start, equalling Graham Hill's record. The pile-up caused the race to be stopped; it was restarted over an hour later, after Laffite had been airlifted to Queen Mary's Hospital in nearby Sidcup.

The race was eventually won by local driver Nigel Mansell, driving a Williams-Honda. Mansell won after a battle with Brazilian teammate Nelson Piquet, finishing 5.5 seconds ahead. Reigning World Champion, Frenchman Alain Prost, finished third in his McLaren-TAG, one lap adrift.

The race also saw the return to the paddock of Frank Williams for the first time since he was paralysed in a road accident in France four months earlier.

This was the final British Grand Prix to be held at Brands Hatch. The international motorsports governing body at the time, FISA, had instituted a policy of long-term contracts with circuits, and Brands Hatch was perceived as a poorer facility to Silverstone, with much less room to expand. At some point in 1986, Silverstone and its owner, the British Racing Drivers' Club (BRDC), signed a long-term contract with FISA; the British Grand Prix has been held at the Northamptonshire circuit ever since. The only time that major single-seater racing returned to Brands Hatch was the London Champ Car Trophy for CART in 2003.

Classification

Qualifying

Race

Championship standings after the race

Drivers' Championship standings

Constructors' Championship standings

References

British Grand Prix
British Grand Prix
Grand Prix
British Grand Prix